Maurice Harry Peston, Baron Peston (19 March 1931 – 23 April 2016) was a British economist and Labour life peer. His research interests included macroeconomic policy and the economics of education.

Personal
Peston was born in 1931 in London, the son of Abraham Peston, a "pleater" in the garment trade, and Yetta R. (née Malt) Peston. He was educated at Belle Vue Boys' School, Bradford, West Yorkshire, and Hackney Downs School. He graduated from the London School of Economics and undertook postgraduate study at Princeton University. He married Helen Conroy in London in 1958.

The couple believed passionately in state education, and sent all of their three children to the local comprehensive, Highgate Wood School, Crouch End, north London. One of their children is the journalist Robert Peston, currently ITV's political editor.

Career

Academia
Peston founded the economics department at Queen Mary College, London, and advised various government departments and Labour Secretaries of State from the 1960s through to the 1990s. He remained an Emeritus Professor of Economics at the College until his death in 2016.

House of Lords
Peston was created a life peer as Baron Peston, of Mile End, in Greater London, on 24 March 1987. He immediately became Opposition Spokesperson for Energy (until 1997) and Education & Science (until 1997). He served as Opposition Spokesperson on the Treasury (1990–92) and Trade & Industry (1992–97). He chaired the House of Lords Offices Refreshments Sub-committee from 1993 to 1997.

When Labour took over government, he chaired the influential House of Lords Committee on Economic Affairs from 1998 until 2005. Since then he worked on the Lords Constitution Committee, and on the committee reviewing the BBC Charter.

Other interests
He was chairman of the Pools Panel during the 1990s, adjudicating on the expected results of football matches in case any were postponed. 

Lord Peston was a patron of the British Humanist Association, as well as an Honorary Associate of the National Secular Society. In the House, he spoke candidly about his existential views, describing himself as someone "who regards all religious belief as failing to meet even the most elementary epistemological and deontological criteria".

References

External links
Robert Peston: My late father Maurice Peston's influence, bbc.co.uk; accessed 24 April 2016.

1931 births
2016 deaths
People from Mile End
Critics of religions
People educated at Belle Vue Boys' Grammar School, Bradford
People educated at Hackney Downs School
Alumni of the London School of Economics
Princeton University alumni
Academics of Queen Mary University of London
Honorary Fellows of the London School of Economics
English economists
Labour Party (UK) life peers
Maurice Peston, Baron Peston
Members of the Fabian Society
Life peers created by Elizabeth II